Vogue China is the Chinese edition of Vogue magazine. The magazine carries a mixture of local and foreign content.

Vogue China became the sixteenth edition of Vogue when its first issue was released for September 2005; its debut had been in the works for over two years.  The magazine's first cover featured Australian model Gemma Ward alongside Chinese models Du Juan, Wang Wenqin, Tong Chenjie, Liu Dan, and Ni Mingxi. Its initial first printing of 300,000 copies sold out, requiring a second printing to be made. The magazine is published by Condé Nast in partnership with the state-owned China Pictorial Publishing House. The magazine has made a profit every year since it debuted.  

Margaret Zhang became the editor in chief of Vogue China in February 2021, replacing Angelica Cheung who had been the editor in chief since the magazine's launch in 2005. Cheung had a journalistic background and had worked for multiple newspapers and magazines in Hong Kong such as Marie Claire and she was previously the editorial director of Chinese Elle.  There are 16 editions of Vogue China published every year. Vogue China currently circulates around 1.6 million copies. 

Mario Testino has described Vogue China as the world's "most important Vogue".

Advertising and profit 

Many advertisers are competing for space in Chinese publications. “Advertisers don’t pay attention to large distribution, rather they prefer a safe environment for their advertisement,” says Hung, the publisher of the independent fashion magazine. It is reported that "fashion labels are putting even more money into advertising in China than in the States." Vogue magazine is already an internationally well-known publication, which makes advertisers feel safe placing their advertisements in their magazines.  There is a large competition to get advertisements in magazines.  “When Vogue came and took away some of the others’ advertising income, Trends Media Group, who publishes Harper’s Bazaar and Cosmopolitan, reported Vogue for a “minor regulatory technicality,” which forced Vogue to move its whole editorial staff from Shanghai to Beijing.” Magazines fight each other over advertisers because they are a large source of profit.  However, since there is no third party auditing system in China, it is unclear whether high profile magazines such as Vogue are profitable because of their distribution sales or the advertisements that they feature. “In a fair market environment, our niche distribution will not seem so distant from the bloated distribution figures of the giants,” said Hung, a publisher of the independent fashion magazine iLook.

See also 
 List of Vogue China cover models
 List of women's magazines
 List of men's magazines

References

External links
Vogue China 

2005 establishments in China
Chinese-language magazines
Fashion magazines published in China
Condé Nast magazines
Magazines established in 2005
China
Magazines published in Beijing
Monthly magazines published in China